Gladys M. Nilsson (born May 6, 1940) is an American artist, and one of the original Hairy Who Chicago Imagists, a group of representational artists active during the 1960s and 1970s.  She is married to fellow-artist and Hairy Who member Jim Nutt.

Biography
Gladys Nilsson was born to Swedish immigrant parents.  Her father was a factory worker for Sunbeam and her mother was a waitress. She grew up on the north side of Chicago and attended Lake View High School, while also attending extracurricular drawing classes. Nilsson later attended the School of the Art Institute of Chicago, where she met her future husband, fellow student Jim Nutt. Nilsson and Nutt married in July 1961, and their son, Claude, was born in 1962. Although Nilsson originally painted with oil paints, she switched to watercolors when pregnant in order to avoid the hazards of turpentine.

In 1963, Nilsson and Nutt were introduced to School of the Art Institute of Chicago art history professor Whitney Halstead, who became a teacher, mentor, and friend.  He introduced them in turn to Don Baum, exhibition director at the Hyde Park Art Center in Chicago.  In 1964 Nilsson and Nutt became youth instructors at the Hyde Park Art Center.

Nilsson's image is included in the 1972 poster  Some Living American Women Artists by Mary Beth Edelson.

Artistic style
Gladys Nilsson's influences were far ranging and included German Expressionism, 15th Century Italian painting, Egyptian tomb murals, Cubism, and, more specifically, Whitney Halstead, Kathleen Blackshear, James Ensor, George Grosz, Paul Klee, Georges Seurat, John Marin, and Charles Burchfield. The result was a style that bordered on surrealism and pop, fantasy and cartoon. She took the human figure as her main subject, magnifying, multiplying, and distorting these figures as she saw fit.

According to the Chicago Tribune, her paintings "set forth a surreal mixture of fantasy and domesticity in a continuous parade of chaotic images."

The Hairy Who Years
In 1964, Jim Nutt and Gladys Nilsson began to teach children's classes at the Hyde Park Art Center in Chicago. The pair and James Falconer approached the center's exhibitions director, Don Baum, with the idea of a group show consisting of the three of them and Art Green and Suellen Rocca.  Baum agreed, and also suggested they include Karl Wirsum. The name of the group show, "Hairy Who?", became the name of the group. It was coined by Karl Wirsum as a reference to WFMT art critic Harry Bouras.  There were exhibitions at the Hyde Park Art Center in 1966, 1967, 1968, and 1969. The 1968 exhibition traveled to the San Francisco Art Institute, and the last show, in 1969, traveled to the Corcoran Gallery of Art in Washington, DC.

Later career
In 1969, Chicago gallery owner Phyllis Kind agreed to represent Nilsson and Nutt, giving both of them their first solo shows. The same year, the couple moved to Sacramento, California, where Nutt worked as an assistant professor of art at Sacramento State College. In 1973, Nilsson became the first Hairy Who member to have a solo show at the Whitney Museum of American Art in New York. Two of her paintings were stolen from the show. In 1974, Nilsson and her family returned to Chicago, moving to Wilmette in 1976.

Though she has traditionally painted with watercolors on paper, Nilsson has also worked with collage. In her later work, Nilsson cut out imagery from fashion magazines in an exploration of ideals of feminine beauty.

She had a retrospective of her art in the spring of 2010 at the Ukrainian Institute of Modern Art in Chicago.

Exhibitions

Selected solo exhibitions

1971
 Gladys Nilsson, Art Gallery, Chico State College, Chico, California
 Gladys Nilsson, Candy Store Gallery, Folsom, California

1973
 Gladys Nilsson, Whitney Museum of American Art, New York, April 12–May 13
 

1979
 Gladys Nilsson, Portland Center for the Visual Arts, Oregon, January 18–February 18

1979–1980
 Gladys Nilsson: Survey of Works on Paper, 1967–1979, Fine Arts Gallery, Wake Forest University, Winston-Salem, North Carolina, September 17–October 17, 1979; Art Gallery, Corpus Christi State University, Texas, January 8–31, 1980; Wustum Museum of Fine Arts, Racine, Wisconsin, February 17–March 23, 1980

1984
 Gladys Nilsson: Greatest Hits from Chicago, Selected Works 1967–1984, Randolph Street Gallery, Chicago, May 5–June 23
 Gladys Nilsson, Candy Store Gallery, Folsom, California, November

1993
 Sum Daze: Hand-Colored Etchings by Gladys Nilsson, Dime Museum, Chicago, September 10–October 4

1996
 Gladys Nilsson, Crocker Art Museum, Sacramento, California, March–April

2000
 Gladys Nilsson, Rosemont College, Rosemont, Pennsylvania, February 3–March 3

2003
 Gladys Nilsson, Adrian College, Adrian, Michigan, January 6–25
 Gladys Nilsson, University Art Gallery, Saginaw Valley State University, University Center, Michigan, October 3–29

2006
 Gladys Nilsson, Tarble Art Center, Eastern Illinois University, Charleston, January 21–February 26

2010
 Gladys Nilsson: Works from 1966–2010, Ukrainian Institute of Modern Art, Chicago, April 9–May 23

Collections

 Art Institute of Chicago
 Brauer Museum of Art, Valparaiso University, Indiana
 Kresge Art Museum, Michigan State University, Lansing
 Los Angeles County Museum of Art
 Madison Museum of Contemporary Art, Wisconsin
 Maier Museum of Art at Randolph College, Lynchburg, Virginia
 Mary and Leigh Block Museum of Art, Northwestern University, Evanston, Illinois
 Midwest Museum of American Art, Elkhart, Indiana
 Milwaukee Art Museum
 Morgan Library, New York
 Museum of Contemporary Art, Chicago
 Museum of Modern Art, New York
 Museum Moderner Kunst, Vienna
 New Orleans Museum of Art
 Pennsylvania Academy of the Fine Arts, Philadelphia
 Philadelphia Museum of Art
 Phoenix Art Museum
 Roger Brown Study Collection, School of the Art Institute of Chicago
 Smithsonian American Art Museum, Washington, DC
 Whitney Museum of American Art, New York
 Yale University Art Gallery, New Haven, Connecticut

References

External links
 Gladys Nilsson in Art in America Magazine
 Gladys Nilsson on Garth Greenan Gallery
 Gladys Nilsson on Artsy
 Gladys Nilsson on Hyperallergic
 Gladys Nilsson on BOMB Magazine

20th-century American painters
21st-century American painters
American women painters
School of the Art Institute of Chicago alumni
1940 births
Living people
Painters from Illinois
20th-century American women artists
21st-century American women artists